Ellam Un Kairasi is a Tamil-language film directed by M. A. Thirumugam and starring Rajinikanth.

Plot 
Major Sundarrajan is a smuggler; Rajini is a mechanic. Incidentally Major Sundarrajan is the father of Rajini, whom he gets to know only in the climax. Meanwhile, they have many conflicts and fights, which is the so-called story of the movie. Seema is the heroine and Surulirajan is the comedian.

Cast 
Rajinikanth as Raja
Seema as Rani
Major Sundarrajan as Manikkam
S. A. Ashokan as Rani's father
Suruli Rajan as Arivazhagan
Sowcar Janaki as Meenakshi
Sachu as Tamilarasi
Shanmugasundaram as Ellappan
Omakuchi Narasimhan
Kullamani
Usilai Mani
Pakoda Kadhar
T. K. S. Natarajan

Soundtrack 
The music was composed by Ilaiyaraaja, while lyrics written by Kannadasan, Muthulingam and Gangai Amaran.

References

External links 
 

Films scored by Ilaiyaraaja
1980s Tamil-language films
Films directed by M. A. Thirumugam